New Market Square, is a super-regional shopping mall and lifestyle center in Northwest Wichita, Kansas.

Shopping malls in Kansas